Mastax tratorius is a species of beetle in the family Carabidae with restricted distribution in the Democratic Republic of Congo.

References

Mastax tratorius
Beetles of the Democratic Republic of the Congo
Beetles described in 1962
Endemic fauna of the Democratic Republic of the Congo